The Dog Salmon River is a  tributary of the Ugashik River in the U.S. state of Alaska.

Among its feeder streams are Figure Eight, Goblet, and Wandering creeks.

It is shallow with many oxbow turns and is not navigable.  The streambed is a mix of gravel and mud, with its milky glacier headwaters growing increasingly muddy as it progresses.

There are many rivers in Alaska bearing the name Dog Salmon River and this river should not be confused with those located on the Yukon-Kuskokwim Delta or eastern Norton Sound.

As its name suggests, the river primarily hosts large numbers of Chum Salmon along with smaller numbers of Pink Salmon and Dolly Varden char.

See also
List of rivers of Alaska

References

Rivers of Lake and Peninsula Borough, Alaska
Rivers of Alaska